Joseph Henry Longford (25 June 1849 in Dublin – 12 May 1925 in London) was a British consular official in the British Japan Consular Service from 24 February 1869 until 15 August 1902. He was Consul in Formosa (1895–97) after the First Sino-Japanese War and at Nagasaki (1897–1902).

After retiring from the service he became the first Professor of Japanese at King's College London until 1916, and then an emeritus professor of the University of London. He was awarded a D.Litt. by his alma mater, Queen's University of Belfast in 1919.

Although not in the front rank of British Japanologists in the 19th century occupied by Ernest Satow, Basil Hall Chamberlain, William George Aston and arguably Frederick Victor Dickins, he did make a notable contribution in the field of early Japanese studies.

Japanophile
Longford laboured long and hard to produce several readable and compendious books on Japan and as a member of the Japan Society of London was a strong supporter of maintaining good Anglo-Japanese relations. He realised that Britain held Hong Kong and Singapore only as long as the Japanese allowed her to do so, and urged the importance of studying Japan on British readers.

Books
 1877 -- The Penal Code of Japan
 1907 -- Japan (Living Races of Mankind)
 1910 -- 'The Regeneration of Japan', in Cambridge Modern History, vol. 12 (1910)
 1910 -- The Story of Old Japan
 1911 -- The Story of Korea
 1911 --  Japan of the Japanese.  New York: C. Scribner's sons.  OCLC  2971290
 1913 -- The Evolution of New Japan
 1915 -- Japan (Spirit of the Allied Nations)
 1920 -- Japan (Harmsworth Encyclopedia)
 1923 -- Japan (Nations of Today)

See also
 Ernest Mason Satow
 John Harington Gubbins
 Thomas Blake Glover - a friend of Longford
 William George Aston
 Anglo-Japanese relations

References
 'Joseph Henry Longford (1849–1925), Consul and Scholar' by Ian Ruxton, Ch. 31, Britain and Japan: Biographical Portraits, Volume VI, ed. Hugh Cortazzi 2007, pp. 307–314, 
The Correspondence of Sir Ernest Satow, British Minister in Japan (1895–1900), Volume One, from the Satow Papers held at The National Archives, Kew, London. published in full for researchers with notes by Ian Ruxton, Kyushu Institute of Technology, Lulu Press Inc., July 2005.  (This book contains many letters from Longford to Sir Ernest Satow.)

British consuls
Academics of King's College London
Alumni of Queen's University Belfast
British expatriates in Japan
1849 births
1925 deaths
British Japanologists